The 2016–17 Furman Paladins men's basketball team represented Furman University during the 2016–17 NCAA Division I men's basketball season. The Paladins, led by fourth-year head coach Niko Medved, played their home games at Timmons Arena in Greenville, South Carolina as members of the Southern Conference. They finished the season 23–12, 14–4 in SoCon play to finish in a three-way tie for the SoCon regular season championship. They lost to Samford in the quarterfinals SoCon tournament. They were invited to the CollegeInsider.com Tournament where they defeated USC Upstate and Campbell before losing in the semifinals to Saint Peter's.

On March 26, 2017, head coach Niko Medved resigned to become the head coach at Drake. He finished at Furman with a four year record of 62–70. Assistant coach Bob Richey was named the interim head coach for the CIT Semifinal, and was named full time head coach on April 10.

Previous season
The Paladins finished the 2015–16 season 19–16, 11–7 in SoCon play to finish in a tie for third place. They defeated UNC Greensboro to advance to the semifinals of the SoCon tournament where they lost to East Tennessee State. They were invited to the CollegeInsider.com Tournament where they defeated Louisiana–Monroe in the first round before losing to Louisiana–Lafayette.

Roster

Schedule and results

|-
!colspan=9 style=| Exhibition

|-
!colspan=9 style=| Non-conference regular season

|-
!colspan=9 style=| SoCon regular season

|-
!colspan=9 style=| SoCon tournament

|-
!colspan=9 style=| CIT

References

Furman Paladins men's basketball seasons
Furman
Furman
Furm
Furm